Fearless (stylised in all caps) is the second studio album by English singer, songwriter, and rapper Fleur East, released on 20 March 2020 by her own label Platinum East & distributed by INgrooves.

The album was supported by the release of  five single. The lead single, "Favourite Thing", released on 4 January 2019, it peaked at number 80 on the UK singles chart marking here second entry on the chart. The second single titled "Figured Out" was released on 4 October 2019. The third single, "Size" was released on 8 November 2019 and featured on the final Debenhams Christmas advert before the stores closing. The fourth single "Lucky" was released on 31 January 2020, followed by the fifth single "Mine" on 20 March 2020 alongside the albums release.

The album was scheduled to be supported by East's first headline tour The Fearless Experience, but this was postponed due to the COVID-19 pandemic.

Singles
The lead single, "Favourite Thing", was released on 4 January 2019. A music video was also released the same day. The song peaked at number 80 on the UK singles chart marking here second entry on the chart.

A second single titled "Figured Out" was released on 4 October 2019 along with a music video.

On 18 November 2019, a third single, "Size" was released through Platinum East/BMG Label. The song also featured on the final Debenhams Christmas advert before the stores closing.

On 31 January 2020, the fourth single, "Lucky" was announced with an album pre-order. 

The fifth single "Mine" was released on 20 March 2020 alongside the album and a music video to promote the album.

Track listing

See also
List of 2020 albums

References

2020 albums
Fleur East albums
Albums produced by Tre Jean-Marie